Gulab Singh Jamwal  (1792–1857) was the founder of Dogra dynasty and the first Maharaja of the princely state of Jammu and Kashmir, the largest princely state under the British Raj, which was created after the defeat of the Sikh Empire in the First Anglo-Sikh War. During the war, Gulab Singh stayed aloof which helped the British victory, and even became prime minister of the Sikh Empire for the final 38 days of conflict. The Treaty of Amritsar (1846) formalised the sale by the British to Gulab Singh for 7,500,000 Nanakshahee Rupees of all the lands in Kashmir that were ceded to them by the Sikhs by the Treaty of Lahore.

Early life 

Gulab Singh was born on 17 October 1792 in a Hindu Dogra Rajput family. His father was Kishore Singh Jamwal. He joined the army of Ranjit Singh in 1809 and was sufficiently successful to earn a jagir worth 12,000 rupees and also 90 horses.

In 1808, following the Battle of Jammu, the kingdom was annexed by Ranjit Singh. Ranjit Singh appointed a governor to administer the newly conquered area which was expanded in 1819 with the annexation of Kashmir by a Sikh force.  In 1820, in appreciation of services rendered by his family and Gulab Singh in particular, Ranjit Singh bestowed the Jammu region as a hereditary fief upon Kishore Singh.
Apart from their sterling services, the family's intimate association with the region commended Kishore Singh's candidature to the Lahore court.  

In 1821, Gulab Singh captured conquered Rajouri from Aghar Khan and Kishtwar from Raja Tegh Mohammad Singh (alias Saifullah Khan). That same year, Gulab Singh took part in the Sikh conquest of Dera Ghazi Khan. He also captured and executed his own clansman, Mian Dido Jamwal, who had been leading a rebellion against the Sikhs.

Raja of Jammu 

Kishore Singh died in 1822 and Gulab Singh was confirmed as Raja of Jammu by his suzerain, Ranjit Singh.  Shortly afterward, Gulab Singh secured a formal declaration of renunciation from his kinsman, the deposed Raja Jit Singh.

As Raja (Governor-General/Chief) of Jammu, Gulab Singh was one of the most powerful chiefs of the Sikh Empire. Under the Imperial and Feudal Army arrangement, he was entitled to keep a personal army of 3 Infantry Regiments, 15 Light Artillery Guns and 40 Garrison Guns.

In 1824 Gulab Singh captured the fort of Samartah, near the holy Mansar Lake.  In 1827 he accompanied the Sikh Commander-in-Chief Hari Singh Nalwa, who fought and defeated a horde of Afghan rebels led by Sayyid Ahmed at the Battle of Shaidu. Between 1831 and 1839 Ranjit Singh bestowed on Gulab Singh the jagir of the salt mines in northern Punjab, and the nearby Punjabi towns like Bhera, Jhelum, Rohtas, and Gujrat.

1837 Poonch Revolt In 1837, after the death of Hari Singh Nalwa in the Battle of Jamrud, the Muslim tribes of Sudhan, Tanolis, Karrals, Dhunds, Sattis and Maldayal rose in revolt in Hazara and Poonch. The insurgency of Poonch was led by Shams Khan, a Chief of the Sudhan tribe  and former confidential follower of Raja Dhyan Singh. Thus the betrayal of Shams Khan Sudhan against the regime was taken personally and Gulab Singh was given the task of crushing the rebellion. After defeating the insurgents in Hazara and Murree hills, Gulab Singh stayed at Kahuta for some time and promoted disunion among the insurgents. Then his forces were sent to crush the insurgents. Eventually, Shams Khan Sudhan and his nephew Raj Wali Khan were betrayed and their heads were cut off during their sleep while the lieutenants were captured, flayed alive and put to death with cruelty. The contemporary British commentators state that the local population suffered immensely.

Intrigue at Lahore 
On the death of Ranjit Singh in 1839, Lahore became a center of conspiracies and intrigue in which the three Jammu brothers were involved. They succeeded in placing the administration in the hands of Prince Nau Nihal Singh with Raja Dhian Singh as prime minister. However, in 1840, during the funeral procession of his father Maharaja Kharak Singh, Nau Nihal Singh together with Udham Singh, son of Gulab Singh, died when an old brick gate collapsed on them.

In January 1841 Sher Singh, son of Ranjit Singh tried to seize the throne of Lahore but was repulsed by the Jammu brothers.  The defense of the fort was in the hands of Gulab Singh.

After peace was made between the two sides, Gulab Singh and his men were allowed to leave with their weapons.  On this occasion, he is said to have taken away a large amount of the Lahore treasure to Jammu.

Recognition as Maharaja 

Meanwhile, in the continuing intrigues at Lahore, the Sandhawalia Sardars (related to Ranjit Singh) murdered Raja Dhian Singh and the Sikh Maharaja Sher Singh in 1842.  Subsequently, Gulab Singh’s youngest brother, Suchet Singh, and nephew, Hira Singh, were also murdered.  As the administration collapsed the Khalsa soldiery clamored for the arrears of their pay.  In 1844 the Lahore court commanded an invasion of Jammu to extract money from Gulab Singh, reputed to be the richest Raja north of the Sutlej River as he had taken most of the Lahore treasury.

However, the Gulab Singh agreed to negotiate on his behalf with the Lahore court. These negotiations imposed an indemnity of 27 lakh Nanakshahee rupees on the Raja.

Lacking the resources to occupy such a large region immediately after annexing portions of Punjab, the British recognised Gulab Singh as a Maharaja directly tributary to them on payment of 75 thousand Nanakshahee Rupees for the war-indemnity (this payment was justified on account of Gulab Singh legally being one of the chiefs of the Kingdom of Lahore and thus responsible for its treaty obligations).  The angry courtiers of Lahore (particularly the baptized Sikh, Lal Singh) then incited the governor of Kashmir to rebel against Gulab Singh, but this rebellion was defeated, thanks in great part to the action of Herbert Edwardes, Assistant Resident at Lahore.

In the second Sikh War of 1849, he allowed his Sikh soldiers to desert and go to fight alongside their brethren in Punjab. The treaties of Chushul and Amritsar had defined the borders of the Kingdom of Jammu in the east, south, and west but the northern border was still undefined. In 1850 the fort of Chilas in the Dard country was conquered.

Maharaja Gulab Singh died on 30 June 1857 and was succeeded by his son, Ranbir Singh.

Gulabnama 

Diwan Kirpa Ram, the "Maharajah's private secretary and the son of Dewan Jwala Sahai, the Maharajah's Prime Minister", of the Diwans of Eminabad family, wrote the first biography of Gulab Singh titled Gulabnama in the 19th century in Persian.

K. M. Panikkar describes Gulabnama as an authoritative source;

Notes

Bibliography

Further reading 

 How Sikhs Lost their Empire by Khushwant Singh
 Gulabnama by Dewan Kirpa Ram, translated by Professor SS Charak
 Memoirs of Alexander Gardner by Hugh Pearse

1792 births
1857 deaths
Hindu monarchs
Rajputs
Dogra people
Maharajas of Jammu and Kashmir
Rajput rulers
19th-century Indian royalty